The Philae temple complex ( , Egyptian: p3-jw-rķ' or 'pA-jw-rq;) is an island-based temple complex in the reservoir of the Aswan Low Dam, downstream of the Aswan Dam and Lake Nasser, Egypt. 

Until the International Campaign to Save the Monuments of Nubia, the temple complex was located on Philae Island, near the expansive First Cataract of the Nile in Upper Egypt. These rapids and the surrounding area have been variously flooded since the initial construction of the Aswan Low Dam in 1902. The temple complex was dismantled and moved to nearby Agilkia Island as part of the UNESCO Nubia Campaign project, protecting this and other complexes before the 1970 completion of the Aswan High Dam. The hieroglyphic reliefs of the temple complex are being studied and published by the Philae Temple Text Project of the Austrian Academy of Sciences, Vienna (Institute OREA).

Geography

Philae is mentioned by numerous ancient writers, including Strabo, Diodorus Siculus, Ptolemy, Seneca, Pliny the Elder. It was, as the plural name indicates, the appellation of two small islands situated in latitude 24° north, just above the First Cataract near Aswan (Egyptian Swenet "Trade;" ).

Despite being the smaller island, Philae proper was, from the numerous and picturesque ruins formerly there, the more interesting of the two. It is composed of syenite: its sides are steep and on their summits a lofty wall was built encompassing the island.

Since Philae was said to be one of the burying-places of Osiris, it was held in high reverence both by the Egyptians to the north and the Nubians (often referred to as "Ethiopians" in Greek) to the south. It was deemed profane for any but priests to dwell there and was accordingly sequestered and denominated "the Unapproachable". It was reported too that neither birds flew over it nor fish approached its shores. These indeed were the traditions of a remote period; since in the time of the Ptolemaic Kingdom, Philae was so much resorted to, partly by pilgrims to the tomb of Osiris, partly by persons on secular errands, that the priests petitioned Ptolemy VIII Physcon (170-117 BC) to prohibit public functionaries at least from coming there and living at their expense.

In the nineteenth century, William John Bankes took the Philae obelisk on which this petition was engraved to England. When its Egyptian hieroglyphs were compared with those of the Rosetta Stone, it threw great light upon the Egyptian consonantal alphabet.

The islands of Philae were not, however, merely sacerdotal abodes; they were the centres of commerce also between Meroë and Memphis. For the rapids of the cataracts were at most seasons impracticable, and the commodities exchanged between Egypt and Nubia were reciprocally landed and re-embarked at Syene and Philae.

The neighbouring granite quarries also attracted a numerous population of miners and stonemasons; and, for the convenience of this traffic, a gallery or road was formed in the rocks along the east bank of the Nile, portions of which are still extant.

Philae also was remarkable for the singular effects of light and shade resulting from its position near the Tropic of Cancer. As the sun approached its northern limit the shadows from the projecting cornices and moldings of the temples sink lower and lower down the plain surfaces of the walls, until, the sun having reached its highest altitude, the vertical walls are overspread with dark shadows, forming a striking contrast with the fierce light which illuminates all surrounding objects.

Construction

The most conspicuous feature of both islands was their architectural wealth. Monuments of various eras, extending from the Pharaohs to the Caesars, occupy nearly their whole area. The principal structures, however, lay at the south end of the smaller island.

The most ancient was a temple for Isis, built in the reign of Nectanebo I during 380-362 BC, which was approached from the river through a double colonnade. Nekhtnebef was his ancient Egyptian royal titulary and he became the founding pharaoh of the Thirtieth and last native dynasty when he deposed and killed Nepherites II.

For the most part, the other ruins date from the Ptolemaic Kingdom, more especially with the reigns of Ptolemy II Philadelphus, Ptolemy V Epiphanes, and Ptolemy VI Philometor (282-145 BC), with many traces of Roman work in Philae dedicated to Ammon-Osiris.

The propyla were pyramidal in form and colossal in dimensions. One stood between the dromos and pronaos, another between the pronaos and the portico, while a smaller one led into the sekos or adyton. At each corner of the adytum stood a monolithic shrine, the cage of a sacred hawk. Of these shrines one is now in the Louvre, the other in the Museum at Florence.

Beyond the entrance into the principal court are small temples, one of which, dedicated to Isis, Hathor, and a wide range of deities related to midwifery, is covered with sculptures representing the birth of Ptolemy Philometor, under the figure of the god Horus. The story of Osiris is everywhere represented on the walls of this temple, and two of its inner chambers are particularly rich in symbolic imagery. Upon the two great propyla are Greek inscriptions intersected and partially destroyed by Egyptian figures cut across them.

The monuments in both islands indeed attested, beyond any others in the Nile valley, the survival of pure Egyptian art centuries after the last of the Pharaohs had ceased to reign. Great pains have been taken to mutilate the sculptures of this temple. The work of demolition is attributable, in the first instance, to the zeal of the early Christians, and afterward, to the policy of the Iconoclasts, who curried favour for themselves with the Byzantine court by the destruction of  images as well as Christian ones. Images/icons of Horus are often less mutilated than the other carvings. In some wall scenes, every figure and hieroglyphic text except that of Horus and his winged solar-disk representation have been meticulously scratched out by early Christians. This is presumably because the early Christians had some degree of respect for Horus or the legend of Horus - it may be because they saw parallels between the stories of Jesus and Horus (see Jesus in comparative mythology#Iconography and #Dying-and-rising god archetype).

The soil of Philae had been prepared carefully for the reception of its buildings–being leveled where it was uneven, and supported by masonry where it was crumbling or insecure. For example, the western wall of the Great Temple, and the corresponding wall of the dromos, were supported by very strong foundations, built below the pre-inundation level of the water, and rested on the granite which in this region forms the bed of the Nile. Here and there steps were hewn out from the wall to facilitate the communication between the temple and the river.

At the southern extremity of the dromos of the Great Temple was a smaller temple, apparently dedicated to Hathor; at least the few columns that remained of it are surmounted with the head of that goddess. Its portico consisted of twelve columns, four in front and three deep. Their capitals represented various forms and combinations of the palm branch, the doum palm branch, and the lotus flower. These, as well as the sculptures on the columns, the ceilings, and the walls were painted with the most vivid colors, which, owing to the dryness of the climate, have lost little of their original brilliance.

History

Pharaonic era

The ancient Egyptian name of the smaller island meant "boundary". As their southern frontier, the pharaohs of Egypt kept there a strong garrison, and it was also a barracks for Greek and Roman soldiers in their turn.

The first religious building on Philae was likely a shrine built by Pharaoh Taharqa of the 25th Dynasty, which was probably dedicated to Amun. However this structure is only known from a few blocks reused in later buildings, which Gerhard Haeny suspects may have been brought over for reuse from structures elsewhere.

The oldest temple to have undoubtedly stood on the island, as well as the first evidence of Isis-worship there, was a small kiosk built by Psamtik II of the 26th Dynasty. This was followed by contributions from Amasis II (26th Dynasty) and Nectanebo I (30th Dynasty). Of these early buildings, only two elements built by Nectanebo I survive– a kiosk that was originally the vestibule of the old Isis temple, and a gateway which was later incorporated into the first pylon of the current temple.

Ptolemaic era
More than two thirds of Philae's surviving structures were built in the Ptolemaic era, during which the island became a prominent site of pilgrimage not only for Egyptians and Nubians but for pilgrims from as far as Anatolia, Crete, and the Greek mainland. Some of these pilgrims marked their presence with inscriptions on the temple walls, including votive inscriptions known as proskynemata, as well as other types. Among these are inscriptions left by four Romans in 116 BC, which represent the oldest known Latin inscriptions in Egypt.

Along with the various contributions of Ptolemaic rulers, Philae also received additions from the Nubian king Arqamani, who contributed to the Temple of Arensnuphis and the mammisi, and his successor Adikhalamani, whose name has been found on a stela on the island. Some experts have interpreted these additions as signs of collaboration between the Nubian and Ptolemaic governments, but others consider them to represent a period of Nubian occupation of the region, likely enabled by the revolt of Hugronaphor in Upper Egypt.  The cartouches of Arqamani were later erased by Ptolemy V, while the stela of Adikhalamani was eventually reused as filling under the floor of the pronaos.

Roman era

The Roman era saw an overall decline in pilgrimage to Philae, especially from Mediterranean regions, as evidenced by the reduced number of inscriptions. Nevertheless, it remained an important sacred site, especially for Nubians, who continued to visit both as individual pilgrims and in official delegations from their government in Meroë.

Several Roman emperors made artistic and architectural contributions to Philae. While most of the architectural additions date to the Julio-Claudian dynasty, the island continued to receive contributions to its temples up to the time of Caracalla as well as a triple arch built by Diocletian. In AD 298, Diocletian ceded Roman territory south of the First Cataract as part of an agreement made with the neighboring Nobades, withdrawing the border to about the area of Philae itself. The Kushite king Yesebokheamani made a pilgrimage to Philae in this period and may have taken over the Roman hegemony.

During the Roman era, Philae was the site of the last known inscription in Egyptian hieroglyphs, written in AD 394, and the last known Demotic inscription, written in 452.

Christianization

Christianity seems to have been present at Philae by the fourth century, at which point it coexisted with traditional Egyptian religion. According to the Coptic hagiography Life of Aaron, the first bishop of Philae was Macedonius (attested in the early fourth century), who is said to have killed the sacred falcon kept on the island, though modern experts question the historicity of this account. By the mid fifth century, a petition from Bishop Appion of Syene to co-emperors Theodosius II and Valentinian III indicates the presence of multiple churches on the island functioning alongside the pagan temples.

Traditional worship at Philae appears to have survived into at least the fifth century, despite the anti-pagan persecutions of that time. In fact, the fifth-century historian Priscus mentions a treaty between the Roman commander Maximinus and the Blemmyes and Nobades in 452, which among other things ensured access to the cult image of Isis.

According to the sixth-century historian Procopius, the temple was closed down officially in AD 537 by the local commander Narses the Persarmenian in accordance with an order of Byzantine emperor Justinian I. This event is conventionally considered to mark the end of ancient Egyptian religion. However, its importance has recently come into question, following a major study by Jitse Dijkstra who argues that organized paganism at Philae ended in the fifth century, based on the fact that the last inscriptional evidence of an active pagan priesthood there dates to the 450s. Nevertheless, some adherence to traditional religion seems to have survived into the sixth century, based on a petition from Dioscorus of Aphrodito to the governor of the Thebaid dated to 567. The letter warns of an unnamed man (the text calls him “eater of raw meat”) who, in addition to plundering houses and stealing tax revenue, is alleged to have restored paganism at “the sanctuaries,” possibly referring to the temples at Philae.

Philae retained significance as a Christian center even after its closure as a pagan site. Five of its temples were converted into churches (including the Temple of Isis, which was dedicated to Saint Stephen), and two purpose built churches were constructed on the north side of the island.

1800s
The island of Philae attracted much attention in the 19th century.  In the 1820s, Joseph Bonomi the Younger, a British Egyptologist and museum curator visited the island.  So did Amelia Edwards, a British novelist in 1873–1874.

These visits are only a small sample of the great interest that Victorian-era Britain had for Egypt.  Soon, tourism to Philae became common.

1900s

Aswan Low Dam

In 1902, the Aswan Low Dam was completed on the Nile River by the British.  This threatened to submerge many ancient landmarks, including the temple complex of Philae.  The height of the dam was raised twice, from 1907 to 1912 and from 1929 to 1934, and the island of Philae was nearly always flooded.  In fact, the only times that the complex was not underwater was when the dam's sluices were open from July to October.

It was proposed that the temples be relocated, piece by piece, to nearby islands, such as Bigeh or Elephantine.  However, the temples' foundations and other architectural supporting structures were strengthened instead.  Although the buildings were physically secure, the island's attractive vegetation and the colors of the temples' reliefs were washed away.  Also, the bricks of the Philae temples soon became encrusted with silt and other debris carried by the Nile.

Rescue project
The temples had been practically intact since the ancient days, but with each inundation the situation worsened and in the 1960s the island was submerged up to a third of the buildings all year round.

In 1960 UNESCO started a project to try to save the buildings on the island from the destructive effect of the ever-increasing waters of the Nile. First, building three dams and creating a separate lake with lower water levels was considered.

Any water that seeped through was pumped away.

Next the monuments were cleaned and measured, by using photogrammetry, a method that enables the exact reconstruction of the original size of the building blocks that were used by the ancients. The transfer itself took place between 1977 and 1980.

Nearby locations of interest
Prior to the inundation, a little west of Philae lay a larger island, anciently called Snem or Senmut, but now Bigeh. It is very steep, and from its most elevated peak affords a fine view of the Nile, from its smooth surface south of the islands to its plunge over the shelves of rock that form the First Cataract. Philae, Bigeh and another lesser island divided the river into four principal streams, and north of them it took a rapid turn to the west and then to the north, where the cataract begins.

Bigeh, like Philae, was a holy island; its ruins and rocks are inscribed with the names and titles of Amenhotep III, Ramesses II, Psamtik II, Apries, and Amasis II, together with memorials of the later Macedonian and Roman rulers of Egypt. Its principal ruins consisted of the propylon and two columns of a temple, which was apparently of small dimensions, but of elegant proportions. Near them were the fragments of two colossal granite statues and also an excellent piece of masonry of much later date, having the aspect of an arch belonging to a church or mosque.

Gallery

See also
Abu Simbel temples
Diocese of Philae
Luxor

References

Attribution

Further reading

External links

Philae Satellite view @ Google Maps

Sacred Temple Island of Philae
Philae @ Mark Millmore's Ancient Egypt
Philae @ EgyptSites
Cruising the Nile: Philae
Philae @ Akhet Egyptology
Philae Temple Photos

 
Isis
Islands of the Nile
River islands of Egypt
Egyptian temples
Ancient Greek archaeological sites in Egypt
Archaeological sites in Egypt
International Campaign to Save the Monuments of Nubia
Roman sites in Egypt
Tourism in Egypt
World Heritage Sites in Egypt
Aswan Governorate
History of Nubia
Blemmyes